Brother Barnabas McDonald  (March 20, 1865April 24, 1929), was a Brother of the Christian Schools involved with youth work, especially among delinquents and orphans in the United States. He is remembered as founder of the Columbian Squires of the Knights of Columbus and as a driving force in establishing the early relationship between the Boy Scouts of America and the American Catholic Church.

Boy Scouts of America

Brother Barnabas was a leader during the early years of Catholic Youth ministry. Together with Victor F. Ridder and with the cooperation of James E. West, he is credited with founding one of the earliest Catholic Boy Scout troops at St. Patrick's Cathedral in 1912, having received formal approval of John Murphy Farley, Cardinal Archbishop of New York.

In 1924 Brother Barnabas and Victor Ridder organized a Catholic Committee on Scouting under the honorary chairmanship of Patrick Hayes, Cardinal Archbishop of New York. Bishop Joseph H. Conroy of Ogdensburg was named chairman of this Committee. Reverend Matthew J. Walsh, president of Notre Dame University was selected as national Chaplain.

Brother Barnabas was selected by the Boy Scouts of America in 1925 to be the Education Director of their "Catholic Bureau" for Scout extension under Catholic leadership, replacing Fr. John F. White. who had served in that capacity since 1919. In 1927 Brother Barnabas was recognized with the Silver Buffalo Award for his service.

Brother Barnabas remained active as Director of the National Catholic Committee on Scouting until his death.

Knights of Columbus

In 1923, at the prompting of Brother Barnabas, the Knights of Columbus established a "Boy Life Bureau." Brother Barnabas was appointed the bureau's first Executive Secretary. The Boy Movement Committee of the Supreme Council of the Knights of Columbus had sent questionnaires to each Grand Knight and after receiving the responses met with Brother Barnabas.

Though Knights of Columbus councils were involved in the Boy Scouts of America and other youth programs, it was decided to establish a youth section within the Order. Under the guidance of Brother Barnabas together with Supreme Director Daniel A. Tobin of Brooklyn, the first Columbian Squires circle was instituted on August 4, 1925.

According to Brother Barnabas, "The supreme purpose of the Columbian Squires is character building." Squires have fun and share their Catholic faith, help people in need, and enjoy the company of friends in social, family, athletic, cultural, civic and spiritual activities. Through their local circle, Squires work and socialize as a group of friends, elect their own officers, and develop into Catholic leaders.

Death
He died in Albuquerque, New Mexico on April 24, 1929.

See also

 Columbian Squires
 Lincolndale Agricultural School
 Institute of the Brothers of the Christian Schools

References

1865 births
1929 deaths
Catholics from New York (state)
De La Salle Brothers
People from Ogdensburg, New York